"Party Your Body" is the debut single released by freestyle music singer Stevie B in 1987. The song had great success in the clubs, which resulted in a contract with the label MRL for Stevie B. The following year, he released his debut album, also called Party Your Body.

Track listings

 US 12" Single

12" single (1993)

Charts

References

External links
 http://www.allmusic.com/album/party-your-body-lefrak-moelis-mw0000196394/awards

1987 singles
Stevie B songs
Song articles with missing songwriters
1987 songs